Read. is a tabloid-sized weekly magazine with a newspaper approach that is distributed to commuters in the Dubai Metro network.

Read. is the first publication in the Middle East region produced exclusively for metro commuters. Read. is published in English and it is available free of charge.

References

External links
 

Dubai Metro
English-language magazines
Free magazines
Magazines with year of establishment missing
Mass media in Dubai
Roads and Transport Authority (Dubai)
Weekly magazines
Local interest magazines